The demon Belial, or characters named for him, have appeared in many examples of modern culture. This is distinct from medieval culture and Milton where Belial was related to the character in Jewish sources.

Literature
 In John Milton's Paradise Lost, Belial is one of the highest demons cast out of heaven along with Satan – though Milton's use of Belial is allegorical.
 In Philip K. Dick's The Divine Invasion, Belial is The Adversary, whose influence around Earth obfuscates reality and interferes with Yah's powers.
 Steven Brust's To Reign in Hell features Belial as one of the Firstborn, an angel of the highest order that takes the form of a dragon.
 In Graham Masterton's "Master of Lies", a/k/a "Black Angel", a series of murders in San Francisco is related to rituals to raise Belial.
 In the novel Nevada by Joshua Stephen Porter, Belial is a talking lizard who preaches Satanism, especially the elements of self-sufficiency  to a very receiving America.
 In Aldous Huxley's Ape and Essence, the post-apocalyptic civilization in Los Angeles worships Belial.
 In Robert A. Heinlein's novel Job: A Comedy of Justice, Alex and Margrethe are granted their request to spend eternity together operating a small town diner and soda-fountain which they acquired with a loan from a bank managed by "Mr. Belial".
 In John Connolly's novel A Game of Ghosts, Belial provides the motivation for some of the characters throughout the book but only appears towards the end. "[High above circled] a massive form, a being terrible in its flawless beauty and implacable in its animosity. Its wings were those of a great predatory bird, its hands and feet curved like talons, its face rapacious with lust, its androgyny hinting at appetites that could never be satisfied. It shone with a brightness that served almost to disguise the depravity of its features, the outward manifestation of its profound corruption."

Music

Lord Belial is a Swedish black metal band.
The US black metal band Grand Belial's Key was named after Belial.
The deathcore band Infant Annihilator references Belial in the 15th track of their debut album, The Palpable Leprosy Of Pollution, An Exhalation of Disease.
Swedish metal band Ghost (known as Ghost B.C. in the United States) in the leading single off their 2013 album Infestissumam, titled "Year Zero," refers to Belial in a repeated lyric that also includes the names of other demons, those being Behemoth, Beelzebub, Asmodeus, Satanas and Lucifer.
Faroese rap group Swangah Dangah's first CD was called Belials synir (The Sons of Belial).
Belial is mentioned in the song "Fall from Grace" from Morbid Angel's 1991 album, Blessed Are the Sick.
American technical death metal band The Faceless also have a track called "Sons of Belial" on their 2008 album, Planetary Duality.
Belial is mentioned in the song, "In Ancient Days," by the British band Black Widow.
A song by Tiigers is called Belial on their EP Belial / Takedown.
A song by the Japanese Visual Kei group The Gallo.
The Norwegian Black Metal band Mayhem includes Belial's name in their song "Pandaemon," where he is the second demon listed.

Television
 Belial was mentioned in an episode of Barney Miller, from its eighth season ("Possession"). A man who seasons earlier claimed to be a werewolf, returned to the precinct now believing to have become possessed by a demon, who made him smash a Nativity scene display at a department store.
 In the Danish program, "Juleønsket" ("The christmas wish") Belial is the main antagonist, though his original story differs as he is presented as an angel who was banished when he killed a rival archangel.
 Belial is the name of a weapons dealer in the Brotherhood' episode of Kings.
 In the superhero television series Legends of Tomorrow, hell is ruled by a triumvirate made up of Belial, Beelzebub and Satan. Belial is portrayed by actor Mel Tuck.
 In the Japanese tokusatsu franchise, the Ultra Series, a character named after Belial called Ultraman Belial exists as a recurring antagonist and character.

Films
The classic 1922 film Nosferatu says that the titular vampire originated from "Belial's seed," implying Belial's hand in the creation of vampires.
 Belial possessed the titular character in The Exorcism of Emily Rose.
 Belial is the name given to the deformed Siamese twin brother of Duane Bradley in the exploitation film Basket Case (1982) and its sequels Basket Case 2 (1990) and Basket Case 3: The Progeny (1993).
 In the 2002 film BloodRayne, based on the eponymous video game, Belial is an ancient vampire who had learned to overcome the vampires' inherent weaknesses.
 The 2009 Ultra Series film Mega Monster Battle: Ultra Galaxy introduces Ultraman Belial, an Ultra Warrior who was banished after his attempt to steal the Plasma Spark. He was transformed by Alien Raybrad into a warrior of darkness and has since then fought other Ultra Warriors, gaining a rival in the form of Ultraman Zero.
 In the 2005 movie The Prophecy: Uprising, Belial was primarily played by horror legend Doug Bradley. In the film, Belial is searching for the Lexicon and takes the forms of people he murders while searching for the Lexicon, a book still being written by God. He plans on using the book to create a new, more aggressive hell. Belial is portrayed as a fallen angel who has rebelled against Satan, whom he sees as having gone soft.
 In the 2011 film Dylan Dog: Dead of Night, Belial is a powerful demon which can be summoned through a magical artifact, the Heart, which contains his blood.
 In the 2014 film Annabelle, the word "Belial" can be seen in a book on the occult.
 In the 2019 film Ready or Not, the Le Domas family practices Satanic rituals to uphold a Faustian pact made by a former family patriarch. The deal was made with a sea merchant by the name of "Mr. Le Bail" (an anagram of Belial). 
 Ghoulies (1984), Demon summoned throughout the film.

Games

The role-playing game In Nomine, based around angels and fallen angels, has Belial as Hell's Demon prince of Fire and the enemy of Gabriel, Archangel of Fire.
In the video game Devil May Cry 4, one of the early bosses is "Berial", a centaur-like demon and the Conqueror of the Fire Hell.
In the turn-based strategy video game Shining Force for Sega Genesis, Belial is a type of non-boss, non-unique enemy character unit.
In Lands of Lore 2, the main antagonist is an Ancient named Belial. 
In the video game series Painkiller, Belial is portrayed as an angel/demon hybrid who was cast out by Lucifer and the other angels for his heritage and sought revenge against his divine brethren when Lucifer ordered Cerberus to amputate Belial's wings.
In the horror action-adventure video game Realms of the Haunting, Belial appears as one of the main antagonists of character Adam Randall.
In the video game Odin Sphere, Belial appears as one of the dragons the characters must defeat in several occasions.
In the video game Final Fantasy XII, Belial (named as "Belias the Gigas") appears as a boss. After the player defeats him, he can obtain him as an Esper and summon him in battle. The Belial is an enemy in Crisis Core -Final Fantasy VII-.
In Dungeons and Dragons, Belial is the former ruler of the fourth layer of the Nine Hells, Phlegethos.
Belial makes appearances in the Megami Tensei games, wherein he is depicted as a large, red-scaled, and winged demon wielding a trident. In Devil Survivor he appears as one of the participants in the War of Bel.
In the Gothic series of games, Beliar is the name given to one of the three Gods, and he is the God of Darkness. His minions and armies generally play the role of antagonists in the games.
In the Devil Summoner games, he is also one of the demons required for the fusion of Alice and is one of her two legal guardians, the other one being Nebiros. Upon Alice's defeat, they capture her soul in a staff and beg the protagonist to revive her with it.
He makes an appearance in the BloodRayne game (as Beliar), where he is a monster that keeps growing until it kills the player.
In the Warhammer 40k universe, Belial was once a Sergeant of the veteran first company of the Dark Angels chapter, the Deathwing.  However, he has now ascended to Master of the entire 1st Company.
Morrigan Aensland from the Darkstalkers series of fighting games (produced by Capcom) is the adopted daughter of Belial, according to her official story.
Belial is one of the heroes in the online game Emil Chronicle Online. He and the other three heroes are involved in the main story of the ECO World.
Belial is one of the Seven Great Evils, the demon lords that rule the Burning Hells in the Diablo series of PC games. One of the four Lesser Evils, he is mentioned in both the first game and its sequel, and finally makes an appearance in Diablo III, where he is revealed to be the Lord of Lies and the evil behind both Maghda's Dark Coven and the trouble in Caldeum in the second act of the game.
 In the Dragon Quest series, Belial appears a regular late game monster.
 In Mechassault, Belial is a medium class BattleMech. It weighs in at ~50 tons and has a top speed of 35 mph. Ordnance carried by Belial includes a Pulse Laser, Gauss Rifle x2, and Crossbow Missiles. Its defensive/special ability is the use of jump jets.
 In Darksiders II, Belial is the last boss who Death must confront in the "Demon Lord Belial" DLC and is one of the beings responsible for the extinction of humankind.
Belial is a HSR card in Valkyrie Crusade, she is a maiden and she can be obtained by using Arcana turn over to make Raphael turn into Belial.
 In the Android and iOS video game Lemegeton by Lantasia, Belial is the antagonist in Episode 2.
 In Total Annihilation: Kingdoms, Belial is the god of Taros, and appears in the game as the Spawn of Belial, the deity unit of Taros.
 In Dungeon Keeper 2, Belial is the name of one of the player's rivals.
 In The Binding of Isaac, one of the items to be found in the Devil Room is the Book of Belial, which increases the character's damage for the current room. While under its effect, he gains angry eyes with tears of blood and an inverted cross on his forehead. The character Judas starts with this item.

Comics
 In the DC Universe, Belial is the father of Lord Scapegoat, Etrigan the Demon and Merlin, and a sometimes member of Hell's former ruling Triumvirate (more often consisting of Lucifer, Azazel and Beelzebub). He also plays a part in the Reign in Hell miniseries as a lackey of Neron, another ruler of Hell. The villain Sabbac, who gets his powers from six demons, also gets wisdom from Belial.
 Belial (spelled B'Liale) is a major villain in the Avengelyne comic book series.
 Belial appears in the Image Comics series Spawn where he is a villain and the president of Hell.

Cartoons/anime
Belial is the name of the demon that appears in front of Ataru in the 17th episode of Urusei Yatsura.The evil Digimon BelialVamdemon serves as the final antagonist for the season in which he appears, 'Digimon Adventure 02'. His English name is Malo Myotismon. He is the most lethal form of the Digimon Myotismon, combining all the power of Venom Myotismon with all the intelligence of Myotismon.
Belial is a character in the manga Angel Sanctuary by Kaori Yuki. The character calls herself Mad Hatter & serves Lucifer due to the fact that she has fallen in love with him.

Manga
Belial is the name of one of the 'Seven Satans', a level of the hierarchy of the lowest layer of Hell, in the shōjo manga series Angel Sanctuary by Kaori Yuki.
In the manga series Vassalord, it was revealed that Barry, an incubus with shape shifting abilities, is the demon Belial.
Belial is a central character in the manga series Tarot Cafe.
Belial is one of Hakuryuu Ren's Djinns in the manga series Magi: The Labyrinth of Magic.
A character in To Love-Ru and female protagonist in its sequel To Love-Ru Darkness, Momo "Belia" Deviluke is named after Belial or Beelzebub, while her father and two older sisters are named after other superior spirits mentioned in Grand Grimoire (her father Lucifer, her eldest sister Satan and her second eldest sister Astaroth).
Belial is the name of Leonard Testarossa's Arm Slave'' in Full Metal Panic! Sigma.
In High School DxD, a family of Devils is Diehauser Belial. He is the head of the current House of Belial, ranked number one in the Rating Games for long periods of time and he is known as the Emperor'''. Diehauser is one of the spectators at Rias and Sairaorg's Rating Game, giving Issei and Sairaorg a run for their money. After Beelzebud was created, it allowed him show his new attacks from the devils he has worked with. Until Diehauser won the game after defeating Bandersnatch. Until in Volume 17, Belial betrayed the Three Factions and Rizevim Livan Lucifer from inside.
 In Blue Exorcist manga, Belial is a demon that serves to Mephisto.

References

Demons in popular culture